Murphy is a census-designated place (CDP) in Mayes County, Oklahoma, United States. The population was 231 at the 2000 census.

Geography
Murphy is located at  (36.130608, -95.247526).

Demographics

As of the census of 2000, there were 231 people, 89 households, and 62 families residing in the CDP. The population density was 53.4 people per square mile (20.6/km2). There were 110 housing units at an average density of 25.4/sq mi (9.8/km2). The racial makeup of the CDP was 66.23% White, 26.41% Native American, and 7.36% from two or more races. Hispanic or Latino of any race were 0.87% of the population.

There were 89 households, out of which 29.2% had children under the age of 18 living with them, 58.4% were married couples living together, 7.9% had a female householder with no husband present, and 30.3% were non-families. 22.5% of all households were made up of individuals, and 10.1% had someone living alone who was 65 years of age or older. The average household size was 2.60 and the average family size was 3.10.

In the CDP, the population was spread out, with 29.0% under the age of 18, 4.3% from 18 to 24, 28.1% from 25 to 44, 25.1% from 45 to 64, and 13.4% who were 65 years of age or older. The median age was 39 years. For every 100 females, there were 99.1 males. For every 100 females age 18 and over, there were 100.0 males.

The median income for a household in the CDP was $17,330, and the median income for a family was $35,227. Males had a median income of $29,125 versus $12,500 for females. The per capita income for the CDP was $10,472. About 13.5% of families and 22.2% of the population were below the poverty line, including 22.7% of those under the age of eighteen and 26.7% of those 65 or over.

References

Census-designated places in Mayes County, Oklahoma
Census-designated places in Oklahoma